Bukit Timah, is an area located within the Central Region of Singapore.

 The term can be applied to several things associated with the area:
 Bukit Timah Hill, the area's namesake hill and the highest elevation point in Singapore
 Bukit Timah Nature Reserve, the nature reserve that surrounds the hill
 Bukit Timah Expressway, an expressway that passes through Bukit Timah
 Bukit Timah Road, a road that runs through the area
 Bukit Timah MRT line, a future MRT line
 Bukit Timah railway station, a former railway station located along the Railway Corridor
 Bukit Timah Race Course, a race course in Bukit Timah
 Bukit Timah Primary School, a primary school in Bukit Timah
 Bukit Timah Satellite Earth Station, a telecommunication station located in Bukit Timah
 Bukit Timah Monkey Man, a cryptid said to inhabit the Bukit Timah forest
 Holland–Bukit Timah Group Representation Constituency, a political constituency that serves Bukit Timah
 Battle of Bukit Timah, a battle fought during the Battle of Singapore